Common End is a hamlet within the civil parish of Distington in Cumbria, England. Common End was on the A595 road until it was by-passed.

References

Hamlets in Cumbria
Borough of Copeland